From the Ground Up is an EP released by the Roots in 1994.  It was the group's first album on a major label, having recently signed with Geffen Records.  It featured four songs that would appear on their album, Do You Want More?!!!??!

Track listing 
"It's Comin'" – 6:31
"Distortion to Static" – 4:26
"Mellow My Man" – 4:49
"Dat Scat" – 5:19
"Worldwide (London Groove)" – 8:16
"Do You Want More?!" – 3:29

References

External links 
From the Ground Up at Discogs

1994 debut EPs
The Roots albums
Albums produced by Questlove
Geffen Records EPs